The Cambanoora Gorge runs between the source of the Condamine River and the town of Killarney  in Queensland, Australia.  It is not officially named and is also known as the Condamine Gorge and the 14 River Crossings.

The gorge begins in the historical area of the head which is bordered by Wilsons Peak to the east and Mount Superbus to the north.  Commencing at this broad grassland, the gorge narrows as the river encounters harder trachyte rock.  This creates a dramatic landscape.

The road through the gorge was used to carry supplies and mail to early settlers along the length of the gorge, and to bring timber to the railway in Killarney.  The Crossings are named First, Second, Double, Mawhirts, Bullocky, Flaggie, Rocky, Mill, Reis', Heywood's, Billy John's, Andrew Evan's, Long and Watson's Crossing in order from The Head down river.

Cambanoora Gorge is an area of outstanding natural beauty in the Border ranges of southern Queensland.  It is a rich bio-region with at least 14 endangered or threatened species ranging from the azure kingfisher to the spotted tail quoll and the glossy black cockatoo.

Condamine River Road runs through the Gorge and is a well maintained dirt road with a speed limit of 30 km/hr. The speed limit through the crossings is 5 km/hr.  The gorge is not a national park or state forest. The gorge is a farming and residential area.

The road through the gorge is bordered mostly by private property.  Drivers should stick to the road and stop at designated stopping areas only including Bullocky Crossing.  Proper driver behaviour is appreciated including slowing down for cows and wildlife on the road, leaving no rubbish, and not driving up the river (platypus there).  Activities such as bushwalking, bird watching, mountain bike riding, picnicking are encouraged.  There is no camping in the gorge unless organised prior on private property.

The gorge is part of the Bicentennial National Trail.

See also

List of canyons

References

External links
 Information about the Condamine River 4WD track.

Canyons and gorges of Queensland
Darling Downs